Leo David Callahan (August 9, 1890 in Jamaica Plain, Massachusetts – May 2, 1982 in Erie, Pennsylvania) is a former professional baseball player who played outfield for the 1913 Brooklyn Dodgers and the 1919 Philadelphia Phillies.

External links

1890 births
1982 deaths
Major League Baseball outfielders
Brooklyn Dodgers players
Philadelphia Phillies players
Baseball players from Massachusetts
Toronto Maple Leafs (International League) players
Newark Indians players
Harrisburg Senators players
Newark Bears (IL) players
People from Jamaica Plain